Serhiy Volodymyrovych Smelyk or Serhii Volodymyrovych Smelyk (born 19 April 1987 in Krasnodon) is a Ukrainian sprinter. He won the bronze medal in the 200 metres at the 2014 European Championships.

He has personal bests of 10.10 in the 100 metres (Erzurum 2016) and 20.30 in the 200 metres (Zürich 2014).

Achievements

References

1987 births
Living people
People from Krasnodon
Ukrainian male sprinters
Athletes (track and field) at the 2012 Summer Olympics
Athletes (track and field) at the 2016 Summer Olympics
Olympic athletes of Ukraine
World Athletics Championships athletes for Ukraine
European Athletics Championships medalists
Universiade medalists in athletics (track and field)
Universiade gold medalists for Ukraine
Athletes (track and field) at the 2019 European Games
European Games medalists in athletics
European Games gold medalists for Ukraine
Ukrainian Athletics Championships winners
Medalists at the 2013 Summer Universiade
Athletes (track and field) at the 2020 Summer Olympics
Sportspeople from Luhansk Oblast